Emil Wallber (April 1, 1841June 2, 1923) was a German American lawyer and judge.  He was the Mayor of Milwaukee, Wisconsin, at the time of the Bay View massacre and labor strike, and adopted the city's first ordinance on an eight-hour work day.

Early life and career

Born in Berlin, Prussia, Wallber immigrated to the United States with his family in 1850.  He is the son of Julius and Henrietta Krohn Wallber, both of whom had also been born in Berlin.  They settled in New York City, where he was educated in the public schools and the New York free academy.

At age 14, Wallber moved to Milwaukee, intent on studying law.  He first took a position as a clerk for Charles F. Bode, who was then justice of the peace.  He then went to study in the law offices of Edward Salomon and Winfield Smith, who would later become the governor and Attorney General of Wisconsin, respectively.  Salomon was elected lieutenant governor in 1861, and became governor on the death of Governor Harvey in April 1862.  On ascending to the governorship, Salomon hired Wallber as his chief clerk.  Wallber served with Governor Salomon until the end of his term in January 1864.  Wallber meanwhile continued his study of the law and was admitted to the State Bar of Wisconsin later that year.  He then returned to the service of Winfield Smith as an assistant attorney general and remained in that role until the end of Smith's term in 1866.

Elected office
Wallber then returned to Milwaukee and practiced law.  He was elected as a school commissioner, and served as president of the school board from 1871 to 1873.  He was elected to serve in the Wisconsin State Assembly for the 1872 session, and served as Milwaukee City Attorney from 1873 to 1878.  He was County court commissioner for ten years, and from 1883 to 1890 was a regent of the state normal schools.

He was elected Mayor of Milwaukee in 1884 and was re-elected in 1886.  During his second term as mayor, there was a major labor walkout during agitation for the eight-hour workday.  The strikes closed virtually every business in Milwaukee, starting on May Day, May 1, 1886.  At Wallber's request, the Governor, Jeremiah McLain Rusk, called up the Wisconsin National Guard.  In what's now known as the Bay View massacre, on May 5, the national guard fired into the protesters as they marched on the North Chicago Rolling Mills in Bay View.  Seven people died as a result, including a thirteen year old boy.

In April 1889, the year after he left the Mayors office, Wallber was elected judge of the municipal court.  He was re-elected in 1895 and left office in 1902.  In his later life, he served as a German consular agent in Milwaukee from 1906 to his retirement in 1917.

Wallber is buried at Forest Home Cemetery in Milwaukee.

Electoral history

Wisconsin Assembly (1871)

| colspan="6" style="text-align:center;background-color: #e9e9e9;"| General Election, November 7, 1871

References

External links
 

German emigrants to the United States
Mayors of Milwaukee
Lawyers from Milwaukee
Wisconsin lawyers
Wisconsin state court judges
Republican Party members of the Wisconsin State Assembly
1841 births
1923 deaths
Burials in Wisconsin
19th-century American lawyers